The Grove cell was an early electric primary cell named after its inventor, Welsh physical scientist William Robert Grove, and consisted of a zinc anode in dilute sulfuric acid and a platinum cathode in concentrated nitric acid, the two separated by a porous ceramic pot.

Cell details
The Grove cell voltage is about 1.9 volts and arises from the following reaction:
 Zn + H2SO4 + 2 HNO3  ZnSO4 + 2 H2O + 2 NO2↑

Use
The Grove cell was the favored power source of the early American telegraph system in the period 1840 – 1860 because it offered a high current output and higher voltage than the earlier Daniell cell (at 1.9 volts and 1.1 volts, respectively).

Disadvantages
By the time of the American Civil War, as telegraph traffic increased, the Grove cell's tendency to discharge poisonous nitrogen dioxide (NO2) fumes proved increasingly hazardous to health, and as telegraphs became more complex, the need for constant voltage became critical. The Grove cell was limited in this respect, because as the cell discharged, voltage reduced. Eventually, Grove cells were replaced in use by Daniell cells.

See also
 List of battery types
 History of the battery
 Bunsen cell, Using cheaper carbon instead of platinum.

Notes
 
 

Disposable batteries